Viral means "relating to viruses" (small infectious agents).

Viral may also refer to:

Viral behavior, or virality 

Memetic behavior likened that of a virus, for example:

 Viral marketing, the use of existing social networks to spread a marketing message
 Viral phenomenon, relating to contagion theory or the "virality" of network culture, such as a meme
 Viral video, a video that quickly attains a high popularity

Titled works 

 Viral (2016 American film), a 2016 American science fiction horror drama
 Viral (2016 Hindi film), an Indian Bollywood film based on social media
 Viral (web series), a 2014 Brazilian comedy web series
 V/H/S: Viral, an American anthology horror film
 Viral: The Search for the Origin of COVID-19, a book by Alina Chand and Matt Ridley

See also 
 Virals, a novel series by Kathy Reichs
 Virulence, pathogen's ability to infect or damage host